The women's banked slalom competition of the 2022 Winter Paralympics was held at Genting Snow Park on 11 March 2022.

Banked slalom SB-LL2

See also
Snowboarding at the 2022 Winter Olympics

References

Women's banked slalom